Joie Chitwood III (born 1971)  is Vice President of Corporate Development for the Arnold Palmer Group. He was formerly CEO of International Speedway Corporation, president of Daytona International Speedway, and prior to that president of the Indianapolis Motor Speedway. He is the grandson of former Indy 500 driver and businessman Joie Chitwood.

Biography
Chitwood attended prestigious  Tampa Jesuit High School, studied business administration and finance at the University of Florida, later earning his masters of business administration degree at the University of South Florida. Prior to his appointment, he had worked for Daytona Speedway's parent company, International Speedway Corporation, since 2009.

References

External links
November 2005 Car and Driver magazine article

Living people
American racing drivers
Racing drivers from Tampa, Florida
University of Florida alumni
Alumni of the University of Cambridge
Jesuit High School (Tampa) alumni
University of South Florida alumni
1971 births